Nuriva is an unincorporated community in Wyoming County, West Virginia, United States. It was also known as Trace Fork and Tracoal. Its post office  is closed.

The community's name is said to be derived from an unidentified Native American language.

References

Unincorporated communities in Wyoming County, West Virginia
Unincorporated communities in West Virginia
Coal towns in West Virginia